Kukavice may refer to:

 Kukavice (Kupres)
 Kukavice (Rogatica)